Acanthoceratidae is an extinct family of acanthoceratoid cephalopods in the order Ammonitida, known from the Upper Cretaceous. The type genus is Acanthoceras.

Diagnosis
Acanthoceratidae species are strongly tuberculate with at least umbilical and ventrolateral tubercles in most genera included.  Ribs are dominant in some, in others weak or absent on the outer whorls.  Most are evolute, compressed to very depressed in section. Sutures are ammonitic with little variation, but showing a tendency for simplication in later genera.

Taxonomy
Acanthoceratidae de Grossouvre, 1894 includes the following subfamilies.
Acanthoceratinae de Groussouvre, 1894
Euomphaloceratinae Cooper, 1978 
Mammitinae (Hyatt, 1900) (= Fallotitinae Wiedmann, 1960; Mitoniainae Renz & Alvarez, 1979)
Mantelliceratinae Hyatt, 1903

References
 Wright, W.C. 1957  Family Acanthoceratidae Hyatt in W.J. Arkell, et al. 1957.  Mesozoic Ammonoidea;. Treatise on Invertebrate Paleontology, Part L. Geological Society of America, R.C. Moore (ed). 
The Paleobiology Database

 
Acanthoceratoidea
Ammonitida families
Late Cretaceous first appearances
Late Cretaceous extinctions